Racket Attack is a 1988 professional tennis Nintendo Entertainment System game. The gameplay takes place in a ¼ overhead view tennis court with the score being present at all times and an audience of spectators being shown in multiple colors (white, pink, and red). The North American version features an endorsement from Wilson Sporting Goods.
The game was released fairly late in the NES life cycle in Europe and the PAL regions, as available sources show, due to the lengthy process of distributing and the fact that Nintendo have still just started to get into the region by the time of the Japanese release of the game.
This game is seen as an overall improvement over the original Tennis video game for the Nintendo Entertainment System with a wide selection of player characters and a deep level of gameplay for the late 1980s.

Gameplay

There are two gameplay modes present: one-player (representing a tennis tournament) and two-player (which represents an exhibition match). After winning seven matches in single-player mode, the player receives a championship trophy. These matches become increasingly difficult as the player progresses through them. It is possible to play on a grass, clay, or hard court. You can play a women's match, best-of-3, or men's match, best-of-5.

There are 16 different players; eight male, and eight female. They have their own strengths and weaknesses for experimenting. However, the male players can only play against other male players while females can only play against other females.

Passwords allow players to retain their statistics after playing for a while; they also allow access to any level between the second round of the tournament and the end game. There are six possible tennis moves; including the lob, volley, and slice. While serving, the camera angle becomes slightly more over the player's shoulder. Women's matches are noticeably shorter than men's matches and players contain unusual names like "Gibbco" and "First." Both buttons of the NES controller are used to hit the ball; the "A" button is used mainly for front-court action while the "B" button is primarily reserved for back court moves. Players can protest to the line judge if a decision is not made in their favor.

Reception
Allgame gave Racket Attack a score of 4 stars out of a possible 5. Power Play gave the game a score of 42 out 100 while Video Games also gave it a score of 42 out of 100.

References

External links
Moero!! Pro Tennis promotional flyer at Giant Bomb
Moero!! Pro Tennis videos at Nico Video

1988 video games
Jaleco games
Nintendo Entertainment System games
Nintendo Entertainment System-only games
Tennis video games
Tose (company) games
Video games developed in Japan
Multiplayer and single-player video games